The Speed of Cattle is a compilation album recorded by the indie rock band Archers of Loaf. It was recorded in Seattle over a three-week period, the longest the band had taken to record an album at the time.

Track listing
 "Wrong" - 3:50
 "South Carolina" - 3:33
 "Web in Front" 2:08
 "Bathroom" - 1:45
 "Tatyana" - 4:43
 "What Did You Expect?" - 3:12
 "Ethel Merman" - 2:42
 "Funnelhead" - 2:51
 "Quinn Beast" - 3:42
 "Telepathic Traffic" 3:04
 "Don't Believe The Good News" - 4:49
 "Smokin' Pot In The Hot City" - 3:17
 "Mutes In The Steeple" - 2:06
 "Revenge" - 2:47
 "Bacteria" - 6:30
 "Freezing Point" - 2:47
 "Powerwalker" - 3:36
 "Backwash" - 2:56

References

Archers of Loaf albums
1996 compilation albums
Alias Records albums